Lázaro Balcindes (born 8 February 1963) is a Cuban former track and field athlete who specialised in the triple jump.

A perennial minor medallist, his first podium finishes were in 1982, when he was runner-up to Lester Benjamin at the CAC Junior Championships then two centimetres short of victory behind Oscar Harris at the Pan American Junior Championships.

This theme continued into his senior career, with silver medals at the Central American and Caribbean Championships in Athletics in both 1983 and 1985 (behind fellow Cuban Jorge Reyna then Bahamian Steve Hanna). A Cuban trio of Reyna, Balcindes and Lázaro Betancourt travelled to England to compete at the 1984 AAA Championships and secured all three top spots, with Balcindes being second to Betancourt.

He competed twice at the global level: he was a bronze medallist for Cuba at the 1985 IAAF World Indoor Games and later sixth place at the 1985 IAAF World Cup, representing the Americas team.

International competitions

References

External links

Living people
1963 births
Cuban male triple jumpers
World Athletics Indoor Championships medalists
20th-century Cuban people